Siren, in comics, may refer to:

 One of two DC Comics characters
 Siren (DC Comics)
 Hila (comics)
 Siren (Malibu Comics), a character in Malibu Comics Ultraverse
 Siren (Image Comics), a series from Image Comics

See also 
 Siren (disambiguation)
 Siryn, a Marvel Comics character

References